Yaroslav Sergeevich Egerev (born 1990) is a Russian male badminton player.

Achievements

BWF International Challenge/Series
Men's Doubles

Mixed Doubles

 BWF International Challenge tournament
 BWF International Series tournament
 BWF Future Series tournament

References

External links
 

Russian male badminton players
1990 births
Living people